Fernando Martins (born 15 August 1952) is a Brazilian boxer. He competed in the men's middleweight event at the 1976 Summer Olympics. He also won a bronze medal at the 1975 Pan American Games in the middleweight event.

References

External links
 

1952 births
Living people
Brazilian male boxers
Olympic boxers of Brazil
Boxers at the 1976 Summer Olympics
Boxers at the 1975 Pan American Games
Pan American Games silver medalists for Brazil
Pan American Games medalists in boxing
Sportspeople from São Paulo
Middleweight boxers
Medalists at the 1975 Pan American Games
20th-century Brazilian people
21st-century Brazilian people